Fernando Samoya (born 5 October 1940) is a Guatemalan former sports shooter. He competed in the 25 metre pistol event at the 1968 Summer Olympics.

References

1940 births
Living people
Guatemalan male sport shooters
Olympic shooters of Guatemala
Shooters at the 1968 Summer Olympics
Sportspeople from Guatemala City